East Island is a former island, formerly about  in area,  long and  wide. It was largely washed away in 2018 by the storm surge from Hurricane Walaka.

The island, a sand and gravel spit that formed part of the Papahānaumokuākea Marine National Monument, was a habitat for Hawaiian monk seals and green sea turtles, both of which are endangered species. 96% of Hawaii's green sea turtles nest in the French Frigate Shoals, and over half of those were on East Island. Charles Littnan, of the National Oceanic and Atmospheric Administration, described the island as "the most important single islet for [green] sea turtle nesting".

During WW2 a U.S. Coast Guard radio navigation station was built on East Island and operated from 1944 to 1952.

In the 19th century, East Island was sometimes called turtle island.

History

The island was surveyed by the Tanager Expedition of 1923 and 1924. At that time it was about 11 acres of land.

In 1932 the USS Quail anchored near East Island, when it used its seaplane to take aerial photographs of the shoals.

In 1935 a "tent city" was placed on East island to support Naval maneuvers in the region, which included exercises with ships and seaplanes.

In October 1936, the USS Wright (AV-1) came to the shoals, and established a base on East island to support a month of seaplane operations.

In July 1944 twenty-seven U.S. Coast Guard personnel moved onto East Island and established a Long-Range Navigation (LORAN) radio navigation station that was maintained from November 1944 to October 1952. station on the island.  the In April 1946 it was badly damaged by a tsunami, and in August 1950 it had to be evacuated due to a typhoon warning. Facilities included 13 buildings including the LORAN building, which was for a radio system to that supported ships and aircraft locating themselves at long distances.

Buildings in the USCG Loran facility included:
Commanding Officer (CO) quarters & recreational hall
Two Barracks
Mess Hall & Galley
Generator Hut & Storeroom
2nd Generator Hut & Machine Shop
Loran Hut & Radio room
Aerology Office
Boatswain's Locker
Distiller Shed
Paint Locker
Vehicle Shed
Crew's Head (Bathroom hut)

Other structures on the island included water tanks, water pump, and the antennas.

In the 1980s, it was noted as a pupping ground for monk seals.

In the late 20th century it was known as a noted breeding ground for Green sea turtles. In 1997 it was reported to have over 500 turtles nests on the island.

In 2018 most of the island above sea level was washed away by Hurricane Walaka. The storm was a Category 4 storm at the time of its passage.

See also

 Desert island
 List of islands

References

Northwestern Hawaiian Islands
Coral islands
French Frigate Shoals
October 2018 events in Oceania
2018 in Hawaii
2018 Pacific hurricane season
Hurricanes in Hawaii
Former islands of the United States
Sea level
Effects of tropical cyclones
Walaka